Rory Duncan (born 26 July 1977) is a former South African rugby union coach and former player.

He announced his retirement at the end of 2011.

He is currently their Director of Rugby and Currie Cup head coach.

References

1977 births
Living people
Alumni of Grey High School
Cheetahs (rugby union) players
Eastern Province Elephants players
Expatriate rugby union players in Japan
Free State Cheetahs players
Rugby union locks
Rugby union players from Durban
Sharks (Currie Cup) players
Shizuoka Blue Revs players
South African expatriate rugby union players
South African expatriate sportspeople in Japan
South African rugby union players